John Chetwynd was MP for Stafford.

John Chetwynd may also refer to:

John Chetwynd (c. 1390–c. 1448), MP for Warwickshire (UK Parliament constituency)
John Chetwynd, 2nd Viscount Chetwynd

See also
 John Chetwynd-Talbot, 1st Earl Talbot (1749–1793), British peer and politician
 John Chetwynd-Talbot, 21st Earl of Shrewsbury (1914–1980), British peer